Hockey Club Forte dei Marmi is a roller hockey team from Forte dei Marmi, Italy. It was founded in 1962 and later refounded in 1995 due to their financial struggle.

Honours

National
Italian Championship: 3
 2013–14, 2014–15, 2015–16
Coppa Italia: 1
 2016–17
Italian Supercup: 2
 2014, 2017

External links
Official website

Roller hockey clubs in Italy
Sports clubs established in 1962
1962 establishments in Italy
Sport in Tuscany
Forte dei Marmi